Legacy of the Ancients is a fantasy role-playing video game published by Electronic Arts in 1987.

Gameplay

The player takes on the role of a young shepherd who finds and loots a recently dead body while on a first trip to the city, taking a black disk, a bracelet, and a leather scroll.  The Galactic Museum mysteriously appears to the player after collecting these items.  The player learns that by taking these items, he has become the next in a line of adventurers attempting to destroy the Wizard's Compendium, the leather scroll the player picked up.

The museum has various display cases that require the insertion of special coins of various types to access.  Some coins can be bought in random encounters with NPCs, some can be found as loot after combat, and some coins can only be found at the bottom level of various dungeons, meaning the player cannot proceed beyond a certain point until that dungeon is finished.

Unlike many RPGs, the game does not use an experience point system.  The player gains levels only through the successful completion of various quests.

The game is mostly in top-down style for the world maps, towns, and castles, but switches to a 3D style in the dungeons and in the museum.

Several different areas of the game, like games in towns and certain museum displays, allow the character to play in special mini-games, which, if done successfully, will permanently increase attributes. Also, various casinos about the towns let players gamble to win money.  It is also possible to rob banks in cities, but this attracts the attention of the town guards, who will remember the robbery until the player enters another town.

Copy protection
The game makes use of a code wheel copy protection that requires the player to match a gemstone and the name of a world on which another branch of the Galactic Museum exists.  The player then has to enter a six-digit number to proceed.  One of the worlds on the disk, Bantross, became the setting for the sequel, The Legend of Blacksilver.

Another part of the copy protection involves an attempt by the program to modify the program disk itself on startup and render it unusable. On authentic game disks, this operation fails since the disks are write-protected. When playing the game using an emulator, it is advisable to set the read-only attribute for each disk image to avoid this modification.

Development
Legacy of the Ancients shares a similar design to Questron.  Although not a sequel, it uses an updated engine shared by Questron and Questron II, and the same developers worked on the games.

Reception
Scorpia in Computer Gaming World in 1988 enjoyed the museum setting of the game, but noted there was very little interacting with the world. The game's difficulty was described as "suitable for beginner and intermediate-level play". In 1993 she called the game "a hack'n'slash of moderate interest".

The game was reviewed in 1988 in Dragon #131 by Hartley, Patricia, and Kirk Lesser in "The Role of Computers" column. The reviewers gave the game 3½ stars.

Reviews
Isaac Asimov's Science Fiction Magazine v12 n6 (1988 06)

References

External links
 
 Images of Legacy of the Ancients package, manual, and screen

1987 video games
Apple II games
Commodore 64 games
DOS games
Electronic Arts games
Role-playing video games
Video games developed in the United States